Risk Capital Partners LLP is a London-based private equity firm, co-founded in 2001 by Ben Redmond and Luke Johnson. The firm invests in numerous sectors, including leisure, retail, media, healthcare, IT services, financial services and support services.

Investment profile
Risk Capital Partners mainly provides growth capital investment, taking minority or majority positions in established, profitable, mid-market UK companies and typically contributing £3-£15 million per investment.

The firm is currently investing a ten-year £75m fund on behalf of pension funds, life companies and specialist fund investors, including £25m provided by Risk Capital's own partners. The firm has participated in a range of investment situations, including development capital for organic growth, management buyouts, shareholder restructuring, company turnarounds and the acquisition/de-listing of public companies.

Current investments
 Curious Brewing - acquired in March 2021 after company put into administration. 
 Gail's - retail bakery and cafe chain
 Neilson Active Holidays - Activity holiday provider bought from Thomas Cook in 2013 
 Superbrands - media and publishing
 Synarbor - educational recruitment
 The Bread Factory - wholesale artisan bakery
 Tile Depot - retailer of floor and wall tiles

Former investments

Politics
In November 2020 the group funded a media consultant for the COVID Recovery Group of anti-lockdown MPs.

Criticism 
In 2005 Risk Capital Partners acquired the Greyhound Racing Association It later emerged that the purchase was part-financed by property developer Galliard Homes and GRA faced a £49 million debt. The company was later dissolved following the disposal of its assets.

See also 
 Luke Johnson (businessman)

References

Private equity firms of the United Kingdom
Financial services companies established in 2001
Financial services companies based in London